Dourthe is a surname. Notable people with the surname include:

Mathieu Dourthe (born 1977), French rugby union player
Richard Dourthe (born 1974), French rugby union player